Ílhavo is a municipality located in the centre of Portugal. The population in 2021 was 39,239, in an area of 73.48 km².

The Municipality of Ílhavo includes four parishes and two cities: Gafanha da Nazaré and Ílhavo (City).

General information

Several stories have been gathered as part of the popular history of this city:

Traditionally, the local women — As ilhavenses — are famous for their great beauty. It is claimed the city was founded by Greek colonists around 400 BC to whom the beauty of "ilhavenses" women is attributed, but others state that the Phoenician settlers are the ones responsible for that.

Ílhavo's nickname is "the city of the lamp" (a cidade da lâmpada). According to legend, one Sunday during Mass, one of the most important relics of the church (an oil lamp) was stolen in front of everybody and was never found. The myth continued given Ílhavo that nickname.

Parishes
Administratively, the municipality is divided into four civil parishes (freguesias):
 Gafanha da Encarnação
 Gafanha da Nazaré
 Gafanha do Carmo
 Ílhavo (São Salvador)

Cities and towns
There are two cities in the municipality.
 Gafanha da Nazaré (city)
 Ílhavo (City)

Civic information
The municipality day is Easter Monday.

City hall motto: "The Sea as Tradition".

Tourism

Seasoned by the salt and the sun, by maritime breeze and by the wild pine scent, the mood of Ilhavo's native people is happy, energetic, daring and creative. The daily working adventure, sometimes tragic, didn't erase the sweetness of these women and men, who, by knowing themselves privileged for inhabiting such a unique territory, full of scenic beauty and disputed by the land, the sea and the salted lagoon, on games of lights and tides, throw themselves to work and leisure, with the same energy, enthusiasm and pride for their culture and identity. Witnesses of that character are the Maritime Museum of Ílhavo, with its Codfish Aquarium, Santo André's Ship Museum and the Investigation and Entrepreneurship Centre, one of the most visited across the country, honouring all those who, in the past and the present, dedicate their lives to fishing, either at deep-sea – such as cod fishing – at the coast or at the lagoon, and even to riverside activities. 

Of that same type is the Museum of Vista Alegre, yet today, a symbol for national excellence on the fields of creativity, quality and entrepreneurship. It reminds not only the industrial heritage of this factory, but also the path of its working community, living in that which is one of the biggest, oldest and still-working European industrial neighbourhoods, almost a mini-city, where there is a lot to learn and to live. Along with this relevant intangible heritage are the Cardadores, iconic figures from Vale de Ilhavo's traditional Carnival.

Such a lifestyle, from each one of the communities of this polycentric territory, is taken out from the gardens, streets and alleys into the cultural equipments… the “Casa da Cultura” is a second home for spectators and  artists, a place to welcome the world, the “Fábrica das Ideias”, just as the industrial city where it is settled – Gafanha da Nazaré – produces and exports art, by being at the service of artistic creation. The “Laboratório das Artes - Vista Alegre Theatre” is a space aimed at thinking, research and experiment, by welcoming the most erudite cultural events, either classical or contemporary. Finally, “Cais Criativo” is a young and effervescent space in the summer, relaxing, just as the beach where it is located – Costa Nova, and introspective and inspiring during the winter.

Sailing, surfing, kitesurfing, canoeing or diving, apart from major water sports and other sport varieties, are the motivational poster of the estuary and the sea, natural amphitheatres for water sports, at a Municipality where bikes, hiking or sport practice at the various public fields, are part of leisure activities, which also includes relaxing at the charismatic beaches of Barra and Costa Nova.

Demographics

International relations

Twin towns - sister cities
Ílhavo is twinned with:

 Funchal, Portugal
 Grindavík, Iceland
 Ihtiman, Bulgaria
 New Bedford, United States
 Newark, United States
 Paraty, Brazil
 Cabo Frio, Brazil
 St. John's, Canada

Friendship
 Cuxhaven, Germany

Notable people 
 Tomé de Barros Queirós (1872–1925) a Portuguese businessman and politician in the First Portuguese Republic
 Mário Sacramento (1920–1969) a Portuguese physician and essayist, antifascist activist
 António Bagão Félix (born 1948) a Portuguese economist and politician.
 Maria Rebelo (born 1956) a retired female marathon runner, competed in two summer Olympics

References

External links

Municipality official website

 
Municipalities of Aveiro District